Ignacio Chaves Tellería was the President of Nicaragua from 1 January to 1 March 1891.  He was born circa 1836 in León, León, Nicaragua and died October 31, 1925 in León, León, Nicaragua.  His parents were Eusebio Chaves and Ramona Tellería.  He was married to Paulina López and their children were Ignacio, Tránsito, Dagoberto and Eusebio, all Chaves López.  His first last name is Chaves, with S, and not Chávez, with accent and Z. Part of the confusion is that some of his children decided to write their last name as Chávez.  In addition, people believed his second last name was López.  That confusion arose from the fact that his son, Ignacio, wrote his name as Ignacio Chávez López. His registration certificate shows the correct names.

References

Chaves Tellería, Ignacio
Conservative Party (Nicaragua) politicians
19th-century Nicaraguan people
1836 births
1925 deaths